Carex perakensis is a tussock-forming species of perennial sedge in the family Cyperaceae. It is native to parts of the South East Asia and Malesia.

See also
List of Carex species

References

perakensis
Plants described in 1894
Taxa named by Charles Baron Clarke
Flora of China
Flora of Assam (region)
Flora of Borneo
Flora of Laos
Flora of Malaysia
Flora of Myanmar
Flora of Sulawesi
Flora of Sumatra
Flora of Taiwan
Flora of Thailand
Flora of Vietnam
Flora of Hainan